Wo Mei is a Hakka village in the Hebe Haven area of Sai Kung District, Hong Kong.

Administration
Wo Mei is a recognized village under the New Territories Small House Policy.

History
At the time of the 1911 census, the population of Wo Mei was 66. The number of males was 30.

The Chapel of The Immaculate Conception was established in 1930 and was consecrated on 20 January 1957 by Bishop Lorenzo Bianchi. The roof of the chapel was damaged by Typhoon Wanda in 1962.

Though not formally recorded as a 'wai' on maps, Wo Mei is locally divided into Wo Mei Sheung Wai and Wo Mei Ha Wai. Sheung Wai is inhabited by members of the Tse family, while Ha Wai is a multi-surname community.

See also
 Hiram's Highway
 Mok Tse Che, an adjacent village located south of Wo Mei.

References

External links

 Delineation of area of existing village Wo Mei (Sai Kung) for election of resident representative (2019 to 2022)
 Pictures of the Immaculate Conception in Wo Mei
 3D model of the Chapel of The Immaculate Conception in Wo Mei

Villages in Sai Kung District, Hong Kong